George Drury (22 January 1914 – June 1972) was an English professional footballer who played as an inside forward.

Career
Born in Hucknall, Drury began his career in non-league football with Heanor Town. He signed for Sheffield Wednesday in 1934, making his debut in November 1936.

Drury joined Arsenal in March 1938, making 11 league appearances in the Football League as they won the old First Division that season. He also played for West Bromwich Albion and Watford, before returning to non-league football with Linby Colliery, Darlaston and Normanton.

References

1914 births
1972 deaths
People from Hucknall
Footballers from Nottinghamshire
English footballers
Association football inside forwards
Heanor Town F.C. players
Sheffield Wednesday F.C. players
Arsenal F.C. players
West Bromwich Albion F.C. players
Watford F.C. players
Linby Colliery F.C. players
Darlaston Town F.C. players
English Football League players